Sahel is a commune in the Cercle of Kayes in the Kayes Region of south-western Mali. The main village (chef-lieu) is Bafarara. In 2009 the commune had a population of 11,630.

References

External links
.

Communes of Kayes Region